Vyagrapureeswarar Temple is a Hindu temple located at Perumpuliyur near Thiruvaiyaru in the Thanjavur district of Tamil Nadu, India.

Deity 
The temple faces east. The principal deity is Shiva. There are also shrines to Ganesha, Murugan, Valli, Deivayanai, Dakshinamurthy, Ardhanareeswara, Chandikeswara, Somaskanda, Nataraja, Bhairava and the Navagrahas.

Significance 
Vyagrapureeswarar Temple also known as Perumpuliyur is one of the five shrines associated with the Saivite saint Vyagrapada. Hymns have been composed in praise of the temple by Sambandar in the Thevaram.

References 
 

Shiva temples in Thanjavur district
Padal Petra Stalam